The northern bog lemming (Synaptomys borealis) is a small North American lemming. It is one of two species in the genus Synaptomys, the other being the southern bog lemming.

Description
They have cylindrical bodies covered with long grey or brown fur with pale grey underparts. A patch of rust-coloured hair is seen at the base of the ears. They have small eyes, a hairy snout, and a short tail. They have 16 teeth and their upper incisors are grooved. They are 13 cm long with a 2-cm tail, and weigh about 30 g.

Distribution and habitat
These animals are found in wet northern forests, bogs, tundra, and meadows in Canada, Alaska, northern Washington, Minnesota, and New England. They feed on grasses, sedges, other green vegetation, and mosses, as well as snails and slugs. Their droppings are green. Predators include owls, hawks, mustelids, and snakes.  They are listed as "Species of Special Concern" for protection and preservation by the State of Minnesota

Breeding
Female lemmings have two or three litters of four to six young in a year. The young are born in a nest in a burrow or concealed in vegetation.

Behaviour
They are active year-round, day and night. They make runways through the surface vegetation, and also dig burrows. They burrow under the snow in winter. These animals are often found in small colonies. Lemming populations go through a 3- or 4-year cycle of boom and bust.

References

Synaptomys
Rodents of North America
Mammals of Canada
Mammals of the United States
Fauna of Alaska
Fauna of the Northwestern United States
Mammals described in 1828
Least concern biota of North America
Least concern biota of the United States